Love (also Love's and Love's Station) is an unincorporated community located in Desoto County, Mississippi, United States.

History
The community was named after W.R. Love, a prominent physician and planter.

The town was incorporated as "Love's" in 1878.

"Love's Station" was a stop on the Illinois Central Railroad, built in the 1850s between Memphis, Tennessee and Grenada, Mississippi.  In the early 1900s the community had a general store.  There was also a post office.

Love today
The community today is largely agricultural, with some homes located along nearby roads.  The Love Cemetery and Old Love Cemetery are located here, as well as the Love First Baptist Church.  Little remains of the original settlement.

The Love Volunteer Fire Department is responsible for protecting a  portion of southwest Desoto County.  The department also operates a Junior Firefighter Program through the Boy Scouts.

Notable people
 Will Dockery, founder of the Dockery Plantation.
 Slim Love, professional baseball player.

References

Unincorporated communities in DeSoto County, Mississippi
Unincorporated communities in Mississippi
Memphis metropolitan area